Joseph Maskey (born 1998) is an Irish hurler who plays for Antrim Championship club St. Enda's and at inter-county level with the Antrim senior hurling team. He usually lines out as a wing-back.

Career

A dual player with the St. Enda's club in Glengormley, Maskey was a key member of the club's senior Gaelic football team that lost the 2019 All-Ireland Intermediate Club Football final to Kilcummin. He has also won Ulster Club Championship titles in both codes. Maskey made his first appearance on the inter-county scene as a member of the Antrim minor team that won the Ulster Minor Championship titles in 2015, before later winning an Ulster Under-21 Championship title in 2016. He made his debut with the Antrim senior hurling team in 2017. Since then he has won one Joe McDonagh Cup title, an Ulster Championship title and two National League Division 2A titles.

Honours

St. Enda's
Ulster Intermediate Club Hurling Championship: 2019
Ulster Intermediate Club Football Championship: 2018
Antrim Intermediate Hurling Championship: 2019
Antrim Intermediate Football Championship: 2018

Antrim
Ulster Senior Hurling Championship: 2017
Joe McDonagh Cup: 2020
National Hurling League Division 2A: 2017, 2020
Ulster Under-21 Hurling Championship: 2016
Ulster Minor Hurling Championship: 2015

References

External links
Joe Maskey profile at the Antrim GAA website

1997 births
Living people
Antrim inter-county hurlers
Pastry chefs